The Grammy Award for Best Musical Theater Album has been awarded since 1959. The award is generally given to the album producer, principal vocalist(s), and the composer and lyricist if they have written a new score which comprises 51% or more playing time of the album.

Process
Over the years, the qualifications for the individual nominees has fluctuated with principal artists, composers, and producers at one point being the sole eligible nominee, to the current (as of the 65th Grammy Awards) standard which is as follows: "For albums containing greater than 51% playing time of new recordings. Award to the principal vocalist(s), and the album producer(s) of 50% or more playing time of the album. The lyricist(s) and composer(s) of 50 % or more of a score of a new recording are eligible for an Award if any previous recording of said score has not been nominated in this category."

When an album does not feature any individual soloist, but predominantly contains "ensemble" recordings, no individual award is given to the members of the ensemble.

Years reflect the year in which the Grammy Awards were handed out, for music released in the previous year.

Name changes
This award has had several minor name changes:

In 1959 the award was known as Best Original Cast Album (Broadway or TV)
In 1960 it was awarded as Best Broadway Show Album
In 1961 it was awarded as Best Show Album (Original Cast)
From 1962 to 1963 it was awarded as Best Original Cast Show Album
From 1964 to 1973 it was awarded as Best Score From an Original Cast Show Album
From 1974 to 1975 it was awarded as Best Score From the Original Cast Show Album
From 1976 to 1986 it was awarded as Best Cast Show Album
From 1987 to 1991 it was awarded as Best Musical Cast Show Album
From 1992 to 2011 it was awarded as Best Musical Show Album
From 2012 it has been known as Best Musical Theater Album.

Winner and nominees
†indicates the winner of the Tony Award for Best Musical

Shows with multiple wins and nominations

Shows with multiple wins
2 wins:
Gypsy
Les Misérables
West Side Story
Into the Woods

Shows with multiple nominations
4 nominations
Gypsy
West Side Story
Into the Woods

3 nominations:
Anything Goes
Chicago
Follies
Guys and Dolls
Hair
Hello, Dolly!
The King and I
Les Misérables
A Little Night Music
The Music Man
My Fair Lady
Sweeney Todd: The Demon Barber of Fleet Street

2 nominations:
Ain't Misbehavin'
Assassins
Carousel
Cabaret
Cats
A Chorus Line
Company
Crazy for You
The Color Purple
Fiddler on the Roof
Flower Drum Song
A Funny Thing Happened on the Way to the Forum
Hedwig and the Angry Inch
How to Succeed in Business Without Really Trying
Joseph and the Amazing Technicolor Dreamcoat
Kiss of the Spider Woman
Kiss Me, Kate
Kinky Boots
Little Shop of Horrors
Man of La Mancha
Me and My Girl
Nine
Oklahoma!
Pacific Overtures
Promises, Promises
Ragtime
South Pacific
Sweet Charity
You're a Good Man, Charlie Brown
Zorba

Individuals with multiple wins
6 wins:
Thomas Z. Shepard
Stephen Sondheim

5 wins:
Frank Filipetti
Jay David Saks

3 wins:
Alex Lacamoire
Charles Strouse

2 wins:
David Caddick
Pete Ganbarg
Pete Karam
Goddard Lieberson
Lin-Manuel Miranda
Stephen Oremus
Phil Ramone
Tim Rice
Richard Rodgers
Stephen Schwartz
Phillipa Soo
Bill Sherman
Andrew Lloyd Webber
Todd Whitelock

References

External links 
 Official Site of the Grammy Awards

 
Musical Show Album
Musical theatre awards
Awards established in 1959
1959 establishments in the United States
Album awards